Ivica Radosavljević (born December 13, 1983) is a Serbian / Swiss retired professional basketball player.

Radosavljević spent most of his career in Switzerland. At , he played as a power forward.

Radosavljević  grew up in Buljane  village in the municipality of Paraćin, Serbia. He  began playing basketball in his home town Paraćin, for the team KK Paraćin. At 16 he moved up to Switzerland and played for STB Bern-Giants, Union Neuchâtel, Boncourt, Etoile Sportive Vernier Basket, BC Chêne, Villars Basket and La Chaux de Fonds Basket.

Since then, he has coached a team in Val-de-Ruz Basket where he won the Swiss 1LN M title in 2019.

Since 2020 he is assistant coach of Fribourg Olympic of the Swiss Basketball League (SBL).

References
 Ivica Radosavljević profile at FIBA Europe
 Ivica Radosavljević profile at EuroBasket

1983 births
Living people
Serbian men's basketball players
Swiss men's basketball players
Serbian expatriate basketball people in Switzerland
Union Neuchâtel Basket players
Power forwards (basketball)